The Ars praedicandi populo (Manual of preaching to the people) is a literary work that was written by Francesc Eiximenis in Latin before 1379. This book belongs to the genre of preaching manuals, which was very developed during the Middle Ages by the scholastics.

This work was found in a manuscript in Cracow by the Capuchin friar Martí de Barcelona, who transcribed and published it in 1936.

Structure
This work gives a rather simple structure for the preacher's sermon:

 Introductio (introduction) : A general introduction to the matter based on a short piece of the Scriptures.
 Introductio thematis (introduction to the matter): A direct introduction to the matter.
 Divisio thematis (division of the matter): Division of the matter, following logic and mnemotechnics guidelines.

Success
According to scholar Manuel Sanchis Guarner, the structure of division of sermons of this work was one of the ones that was used by the famous contemporary Valencian preacher saint Vicent Ferrer in his sermons.

The Ars Praedicandi Populo inside Eiximenis' complete works 
 Francesc Eiximenis' complete works (in Catalan and in Latin).

References

14th-century Latin books
Francesc Eiximenis